Seth Scott Bishop (February 7, 1852 – September 6, 1923) was a United States laryngologist. He practiced in Chicago.

Biography
Seth Scott Bishop was born at Fond du Lac, Wisconsin on February 7, 1852. He graduated in 1876 at Northwestern University, and subsequently was appointed professor of otology at the Chicago Post-Graduate Medical School and Hospital and professor of diseases of the nose, throat, and ear at the Illinois Medical College.

He married Jessie Abagail Button on March 23, 1885, and they had two children.

He died at his home in Evanston, Illinois on September 6, 1923.

Literary activity
He became an editor of The Laryngoscope, and published a work on Diseases of the Ear, Nose, and Throat, and Their Accessory Cavities (1897).

References

1852 births
1923 deaths
Physicians from Illinois
Northwestern University alumni